Working for a Nuclear Free City (sometimes abbreviated to WFANFC) was an indie nu gaze band from Manchester, England.

History
Original members Phil Kay (production and keyboard) and Gary McClure (guitar) formed as a studio entity in 1999; WFANFC began performing live in 2004, after adding drummer Jon Kay and bassist Ed Hulme to the group.  Guitarist Neil Harris joined the band shortly before their American tour in 2008.

The band's self-titled debut album was released in the UK in 2006. Tracks from the album also formed part of their debut American release, Businessmen & Ghosts, which came out in November 2007. The band cites a wide array of influences, including artists as disparate as Bill Evans, Devo, The Grateful Dead, and Yes. WFANFC's sound has been described as "a flawless lucid-dream trip through a thousand fantastical influences" and "as fresh as morning rain on Piccadilly Gardens". Regarding their importance, major media outlets such as the BBC have stated: "it’s the way that [WFANFC and The Longcut, another British music group] have distilled Manchester’s history into an exciting future brew that makes them important."

WFANFC's releases have won them praise from a variety of media outlets, including Spin, the BBC, Stylus, and Citylife magazine; their song "Rocket" was featured on National Public Radio in June 2007.

The band performed on the Topman Unsigned Stage at the Carling Weekend's Leeds Festival in 2007.

In 2009 the band was approached by the development team for the video game Infamous to create the song that plays at the end of the game. The song is called "Silent Melody".

The band released their third album, Jojo Burger Tempest, in October 2010, and in January 2011 the band opened a YouTube channel, uploading snippets of a fourth album, Apoptosis. No record label was named. In 2011, the band released the single "Turning Shadow" via their Bandcamp.

In 2013, guitarist Gary McClure released his solo record, Wreaths, on AED Records. In celebration of this release, the band's Facebook page shared an unreleased 52-minute-long album titled Odds and Sods posted to member Phil Kay's SoundCloud.

In 2014, producer and keyboardist Phil Kay released his solo record, Zoetrope as King of the Mountains on Melodic Records.

Gary McClure currently records under the name American Wrestlers, and released his debut album, American Wrestlers, in 2014. During promotion for the album, he noted the band had broken up. A new album, however, entitled What Do People Do All Day was released in 2016.

Discography

Studio albums
 Working for a Nuclear Free City (2006)
 Businessmen & Ghosts (2007)
 Jojo Burger Tempest (2010)
 Odds and Sods (unreleased, 2013)
 What Do People Do All Day? (2015)

EPs
 Rocket (2007)
 Apoptosis (Unreleased, 2011)
 Turning Shadow - Single (2011)

Related albums
 Secret Things (2010), featuring members of Working for a Nuclear Free City and produced by member Phil Kay
 Wreaths (2013), solo album by guitarist Gary McClure
 Zoetrope (2014), solo album by producer and keyboardist Phil Kay under the alias "King of the Mountains"

In other media
In 2008, the band composed a commissioned piece, "History", for the Go On Lad Hovis advertisement.  
In 2009, Spoke Film's director Gary Holder used the song "England" in a launch film for the Jaguar X-Type: X409.
In 2009 the band produced another commissioned track for the PlayStation 3 game inFamous, and was used in the Power Trip trailer for the game.  The track, entitled "Silent Melody", was available for download on iTunes on May 21, 2009.

The song "Dead Fingers Talking" was featured in Pilot of the AMC Original Series Breaking Bad.

The song "Asleep at the Wheel" was used for a relaunch trailer for the British Channel 5 re-branding in 2008 and at the close of an Apple promotional video for the 10/2009 update of the iMac.

The song "Rocket" was used in the soundtrack for the movie Push.

References

Musical groups from Manchester
Musical groups established in 1999
1999 establishments in England